Helena Kružíková (17 November 1928 – 3 March 2021) was a Czech actress.

Biography
After two years at the Brno Conservatory, Kružíková then transferred to the newly established Janáček Academy of Music and Performing Arts, where she graduated in 1950. She first acted in the Těšín Theatre and subsequently the National Theatre Brno. She also taught acting at the Brno Conservatory from 1974 to 1991. In 2019, she received a Thalia Award for Lifetime Achievement in Drama.

Helena Kružíková died on 3 March 2021 at the age of 92.

Filmography
Olověný chléb (1953)
Přicházejí ze tmy (1953)
 (1957)
První den mého syna (1964)
Vysoká zeď (1964)
Plavení hříbat (1975)

References

1928 births
2021 deaths
People from Třebíč
Czech film actresses
Czech stage actresses
Czech television actresses
Czech voice actresses
Brno Conservatory alumni
Janáček Academy of Music and Performing Arts alumni
Recipients of the Thalia Award